Avraham Ben-Yitzhak (1883–1950) was a Hebrew poet.

Biography
He was born Avraham Sonne, on September 13, 1883, in Przemyśl, Austrian Galicia, a region of Eastern Europe which has changed hands throughout history between Austria and Poland. In his youth, Przemyśl was part of the Austrian Empire, and he moved to Vienna to study. In 1938 he fled to the British Mandate of Palestine after the German occupation of Vienna. He died in 1950 in Israel of tuberculosis. He had only published eleven poems in his lifetime. These, and a few more, were rediscovered after his death.

He was a friend of Elias Canetti, who met him in 1933. Canetti describes "Dr. Sonne" in his autobiographical book Das Augenspiel (The Play of the Eyes). In his description, Avraham Ben-Yitzhak appears as a profound scholar with interests in religion, philosophy, psychology and sociology. Dr. Sonne had a lasting influence on Canetti, who later wrote a profile of him in the April 7, 1986, edition of The New Yorker. He was also a friend of James Joyce and rumored to be romantically attached to Leah Goldberg. Most of all, and especially in his later years, his friends remembered him for his long silences.

References

 The Modern Hebrew Poem Itself (2003), 
 Avraham Ben-Yitzhak, Collected Poems, trans. Peter Cole (Jerusalem: Ibis, 2003).

External links
 The Poetry of Avraham Ben-Yitzhak
 New translations of Ben-Yitzhak's poems and other writings
 Translation of Ben-Yitzhak's 'The Lonely Say'

1883 births
1950 deaths
Israeli poets
20th-century poets
Burials at Nahalat Yitzhak Cemetery